The 2007 Six Nations Championship was the eighth series of the rugby union Six Nations Championship. Including the previous incarnations as the Home Nations and Five Nations, this was the 113th series of the international championship. Fifteen matches were played over five weekends from 3 February to 17 March.

In this year, France again won on points difference above Ireland, after four teams had at least a mathematical chance of topping the table going into the final week. Italy had their first away win of the tournament, beating Scotland in Edinburgh. It was also the first time that they won two of their matches, as they went on to beat Wales in Rome, finishing in 4th place, their best result so far. Scotland won the wooden spoon on points difference below Wales, and Ireland won the Triple Crown for the second straight year and third time in four years.

Participants
The teams involved were:

Squads

Table

After Round 4 of the competition, all of the teams had lost at least one match, and as a result, no one could win the Grand Slam.
Ireland won the Triple Crown for the second straight year and third time in four years.

The first four rounds
In the build-up to the competition, Ireland were being tipped as favourites for the Grand Slam, having played well during the Autumn Tests. However, despite having started strongly with a win against Wales, they lost to France 20–17 in an historic encounter at Croke Park. In turn, Ireland went on to beat England, who subsequently won against France.

Round 3 of the competition saw Italy win their first ever away match in the Six Nations. Scotland conceded three tries (all converted) in the first six minutes, and Italy went on to secure an historic 37–17 victory. In the same round, England's defeat by Ireland at Croke Park 43–13 marked their worst result ever in the history of the tournament, both in number of points conceded and in points difference (30 points).

In round 4, Italy achieved a second victory in the same tournament for the first time, when they defeated Wales 23–20 in Rome in a match that ended in controversy. Trailing by three points, Wales had the chance to equalise in the closing moments of the game when they were awarded a kickable penalty near the Italian 22-metre line. But, having been informed by the referee that 10 seconds remained, they chose to kick for touch, believing that there was time for an attacking line-out and possible try-scoring opportunity, only for the referee to blow his whistle and end the game before the line-out could form. The Welsh players were incensed and the referee later apologised for the misunderstanding that had arisen.

Final day
All three matches in week five of the tournament were played on the same day and four teams — France, Ireland, England and Italy — still had a chance of winning the tournament: France were narrowly ahead of Ireland on points difference, England and Italy could become champions if they won by a large margin and the other results favoured them.

The game between Ireland and Italy was played first. At half-time, Ireland led by a single point, but they extended their lead in the second half. As time ran out, Ireland were in possession and could have kicked the ball into touch, ending the game and leaving France requiring a 30-point margin in their game; instead, they opted to seek another try, supposedly to set France a bigger target, only for Italy to regain possession and score a converted try, reducing France's target to 23 points.

The second game was between France and Scotland. After starting slowly, France steadily extended their lead, but were still three points short of their target when, with time running out, Elvis Vermeulen scored a try in injury-time, which was converted, to give France a 27-point victory and put them in the lead in the tournament. The referee referred the try to the Television Match Official (TMO), an Irishman, asking if there was any reason why the try should not be awarded. The TMO advised that there was no reason, and the referee awarded the try.

In the final match, England needed to beat Wales by 57 points to overtake France, while Wales were trying to avoid the wooden spoon. Wales led 15–0 after 15 minutes and 18–15 at half-time, and though England managed to draw level in the second half, James Hook then kicked two penalties and a drop goal, to give Wales the victory by 27–18. This result confirmed France's position as champions and handed the wooden spoon to Scotland, both on points difference.

Results

Round 1

Round 2

Round 3

Round 4

Ireland won the Triple Crown.

This was the first time that Italy won two matches in a Six Nations Championship.

England's victory meant that no team could now win the Grand Slam.

Round 5

France needed to win by 24 points to overtake Ireland.

England needed to win by 57 points to win the Championship.

Scorers

Notes

References

 
2007 rugby union tournaments for national teams
2007
2006–07 in European rugby union
2006–07 in Irish rugby union
2006–07 in English rugby union
2006–07 in Welsh rugby union
2006–07 in Scottish rugby union
2006–07 in French rugby union
2006–07 in Italian rugby union
February 2007 sports events in Europe
March 2007 sports events in Europe